Vacinuff Morrison (born 19 May 1952) is a British judoka. He competed in the men's half-middleweight event at the 1976 Summer Olympics.

Judo career
Morrison came to prominence after winning two bronze medals (individual and team) at the 1973 European Judo Championships. He became champion of Great Britain, winning the light-middleweight division at the British Judo Championships in 1974 and 1975.

In 1976, he was selected to represent Great Britain at the 1976 Summer Olympics, competing in the men's 70 kg division he just missed out on a medal after reacing the repechage final (bronze medal play off) but losing out to Patrick Vial. Later that year Morrison won a third British Championship, despite the weight class increasing to under 78kg.

References

1952 births
Living people
British male judoka
Olympic judoka of Great Britain
Judoka at the 1976 Summer Olympics
Place of birth missing (living people)
20th-century British people